Simenti Airport  is an airport serving Simenti in Senegal.

References

 Google Maps - Simenti

External links
 

Airports in Senegal